Charidotella is a genus of tortoise beetles in the family Chrysomelidae. There are at least 100 described species in Charidotella.

See also
 List of Charidotella species

References

Further reading

External links

 

Cassidinae
Articles created by Qbugbot